Sir Thomas Lynedoch Graham  (5 May 1860 – 7 May 1940) was a South African judge and politician.

Early life and education
Graham was born in Grahamstown, Cape Colony, which had been founded by his ancestor, Colonel John Graham, in 1812. He was educated at St Andrew's College, Grahamstown and Clare College, Cambridge and was called to the bar by the Inner Temple in 1885.

Legal and political career

Returning to South Africa, he became an advocate of the Supreme Court of Cape Colony. In 1898, he took silk and was elected to the Cape Colony Legislative Council, the Upper House of the Parliament of Cape Colony. Soon afterwards he was appointed Attorney-General in Sir Gordon Sprigg's third government. However, in June 1898 a vote of no confidence was passed in the government, which resigned.

Two years later, Sprigg was back in government, with Graham as Colonial Secretary. In 1902 he became Attorney-General again and from June to August he acted as Prime Minister while Sprigg attended the Coronation of King Edward VII in London.

In 1904 Sprigg's government fell again and Graham was appointed a judge. In 1913 he was appointed Judge-President of the Eastern Districts Local Division of the Supreme Court of South Africa, with his seat in his hometown. He held this post until his retirement in 1937.

He was knighted in the 1920 New Year Honours.

Sport participation
In September 1882, Graham participated in the Oxford and Cambridge Challenge Cup tennis tournament, played on grass in Oxford, where he lost in the first round to Robert Wallace Glen Lee Braddell, the son of Sir Thomas Braddell. In 1891 he won the South African Doubles Lawn Tennis Championship. Graham was also a keen cricketer and represented the Cape Town based, Western Province Cricket Club, as a fast bowler.

Footnotes

References
Obituary, The Times, 8 May 1940

1860 births
1940 deaths
19th-century South African lawyers
20th-century South African judges
20th-century South African lawyers
Alumni of Clare College, Cambridge
Alumni of St. Andrew's College, Grahamstown
South African judges
Knights Bachelor
Members of the Inner Temple
Members of the Legislative Council of the Cape Colony
People from Makhanda, Eastern Cape
South African knights
South African male tennis players
South African Queen's Counsel